Bojan Grego (born 9 July 1970) is a Croatian sailor. He competed in the Flying Dutchman event at the 1992 Summer Olympics.

References

External links
 

1970 births
Living people
Croatian male sailors (sport)
Olympic sailors of Croatia
Sailors at the 1992 Summer Olympics – Flying Dutchman
Sportspeople from Rijeka